Ivan Vladimirovich Lopukhin (February 24, 1756, Oryol Governorate–June 22, 1816, Oryol Governorate) was an Imperial Russian philosopher, mystic, writer and humanitarian.

Born to the wealthy Lopukhin family in 1756 in Voskreskenskoye, Lopukhin joined the Preobrazhensky Lifeguard regiment in 1775. He retired a colonel 7 years later due to health concerns. After serving as a counselor and later court president on the Moscow Criminal court between 1782 and 1785, he was introduced to rosicrucianism, martinism and freemasonry through his friend Nikolay Novikov and began a career as a writer and printer, while entering civil service. He became Senator in 1798.

In 1801, Tsar Alexander I asked Lopukhin to investigate complaints by the Doukhobors, his reports in 1802 leading to their resettlement on the Molochnaya River, along with other religious minorities.

Selective bibliography 
 1790 'Nravouchitelnyi Katezhizis Istinnykh Franmasonov'
 1791 'Catechism of the True Freemason' Нравоучительный катехизис истинных франкмасонов
 1791 'The Spiritual Knight or searching for wisdom". Духовный рыцарь или ищущий премудрости
 1794 'The effusion of the heart of the man of Desire"
 1795 'The description of several pictures and tableaus based on some fragments, which are located in the archives of Internal Affairs explaining the motives, actions and downright blindness of the corrupt Frenchmen'
 1795 'Improvisations to songs by Davydov'
 1796 'The image of the dream of equality, and the violent freedom being the fruits thereof'
 1798 'Some Characteristics of the Interior Church'

References

 Berg, A. 'Ivan Lopukhin and the Development of Mystical Historiosophy in Late Eighteenth-Century Russia' The Yearbook of the "Gheorghe Şincai" Institute for Social Sciences and the Humanities of the Romanian Academy XI, (2008): 44–57.

External links
 Ivan Vladimirovich Lopukhin, His Life and Role in Doukhobor History, Doukhobor Heritage website, by Jonathan Kalmakoff.
 Translation of excerpts from 'Some Characteristics of the Interior Church'
 Excerpts from Lopukhin's Rosicrucian catechisms

1756 births
1816 deaths
Ivan
Martinism
Russian Freemasons
Doukhobors
Mystics
Russian humanitarians
Russian Imperial Guard officers
Military personnel of the Russian Empire
18th-century people from the Russian Empire
19th-century people from the Russian Empire
Lawyers from the Russian Empire
Philosophers from the Russian Empire
Politicians of the Russian Empire
Writers from the Russian Empire